Ben-Tzur  a Hebrew surname literally meaning son of Tzur. Notable people with the surname include:

Shmaryahu Ben-Tzur,  Israeli politician
Shye Ben Tzur, Israeli musician
Yoav Ben-Tzur,  Israeli politician and rabbi

See also 

Hebrew-language surnames